The Last Sentence is a 1917 American silent drama film directed by Ben Turbett and starring Marc McDermott, Miriam Nesbitt and Herbert Prior.

Main cast
 Marc McDermott as George Crosby
 Miriam Nesbitt as Cynthia Ford
 Grace Williams as Renée Kerouac
 Herbert Prior as Hoel Calloc
 Florence Stover as Mrs. Crosby
 Gladys Gane as Georgiana
 Elaine Ivans as Georgette
 Raymond McKee as Val Lewis
 Margery Bonney Erskine as Mrs. Lewis
 Jessie Stevens as Mére Kerouac
 William Wadsworth as Pére Kerouac

References

Bibliography
 Langman, Larry. American Film Cycles: The Silent Era. Greenwood Publishing, 1998.

External links
 

1917 films
1917 drama films
1910s English-language films
American silent feature films
Silent American drama films
American black-and-white films
Films directed by Ben Turbett
Edison Studios films
1910s American films